TOTVS S.A. is a Brazilian software company headquartered in São Paulo. It has 70,000 clients of diverse sizes operating in 12 sectors of the Brazilian economy: Agribusiness, Logistics, Manufacturing, Distribution, Retail, Services, Education, Hospitality, Legal, Construction, Health and Financial Services. According to FGV, TOTVS is the market leader in management software in Brazil.

The company has invested R$2 billion in R&D over the last five years to meet its clients’ demands. TOTVS has over 50% market share in Brazil, is among the top 3 players in Latin America and has clients in over 40 countries. With approximately 10,000 TOTVERS (as its employees are called internally) in own units and franchises, the company was Brazil’s 25th most valuable brand in 2020, as per the ranking announced by Interbrand, the only software brand in the ranking. In Brazil, it has 15 branches, 52 franchises and 10 development centers. In the international market, it has two units in Argentina, a technological development center and a commercial unit in Mexico, one innovation laboratory in the U.S., and one unit each in Colombia and Chile.

History 
In the 1980s, microcomputing was becoming popular and gaining market share. Laércio Cosentino, who was 23 at the time and worked as a director at Siga, recognized the potential reach of personal computers (PC) and saw an opportunity to create a new company that would develop software for microcomputers used in companies. He proposes, over lunch, a partnership with his boss Ernesto Haberkorn, owner of Siga. Microsiga was thus born in September 1983.

Each partner held 50% interest in the new company and it was agree that Laércio would manage the company, which will provide integrated enterprise management solutions affordable to small and midsized companies already using microcomputers.

In 1989, Microsiga launched an audacious expansion plan through its pioneering (in the technology segment) system of franchises. The project was named ‘Treaty of Tordesillas’ and the first four franchises were inaugurated in four Brazilian cities: Rio de Janeiro, Belo Horizonte, Recife and Porto Alegre.

In 1992, Microsiga shifted its head office from the district of Perdizes to Avenida Braz Leme in the North Zone of São Paulo. It also kicked off the integration of the company into the surrounding community through actions aimed at preserving public areas in the region. In 1994, Microsiga Software S.A. became the first Brazilian software company to obtain the ISO 9001 certification and a certificate for the quality of the Life Cycle process of software developed by it.

The year 1995, was marked by the launch of Advanced Protheus 5 (AP 5), the ERP software that succeeded Siga Advanced. In 1997, the company started its international expansion by opening a branch office in Argentina. Continuing the expansion project, the newly opened branch office in Argentina helped open new franchises in Chile, Paraguay and Uruguay between 1997, and 2003.

In 1998, the Protheus system was officially launched. Currently, the Protheus Line ERP is the market leader, thanks to its high customization capacity and its ability to meet the needs of companies in diverse sectors. The same year, the company established the Instituto de Oportunidade Social (IOS), which provides free professional training and employment support to youth and people with disabilities.

The year 1999, was marked by the entry of private equity – Advent International Corporation, a U.S.-based investment fund, acquired 25% of Microsiga’s share capital. The same year, the company officially launched ADVPL, its proprietary language designed to make systems development more flexible.

In 2003, Microsiga acquired the assets of Sipros, a Mexican company specializing in the development and sale of computerized payroll and human resources solutions.

In 2005, Microsiga took on a new look, becoming a new company: TOTVS, with the mission of reinforcing its position as a company capable of serving everyone with its comprehensive portfolio of technologies, regardless of the specific requirements of each sector.

In 2006, TOTVS held its Initial Public Offering (IPO), becoming first IT company in Latin America to go public, with its shares listed on B3’s Novo Mercado segment. Consequently, TOTVS consolidates its position by acquiring software competitors such as RM Sistemas and Datasul.

In 2009, Universo TOTVS is born. It is the company’s principal event to showcase the trends and innovations in its systems and applications to clients. It has since become one of the leading technology events in Brazil.

2010 was marked by TOTVS’ entry into the U.S. market through a partnership with Stanford University. At that time, the company’s market value reached US$1 billion, making it the 1st Brazilian Unicorn, at a time when the term was little known.

In 2012, TOTVS Labs was inaugurated in Mountain Ville in the Silicon Valley in California, the world’s leading IT and innovation hub at that time. In 2013, TOTVS acquired five companies: Ciashop, PRX, RMS, Seventeen and PC Sistemas.

Another significant event at the time was the acquisition, through TOTVS Venture, of non-controlling interest in GoodData Corp., a company in California that provides business intelligence solutions in the cloud based on big data technology, which stores and manages huge databases.

The same year, TOTVS launched TOTVS Fluig, a productivity platform that enables integration of the entire document management process, parametrization of workflows, and enhances the security and secrecy of data exchanged between employees.

In 2015, 60% of Neolog’s capital was merged with TOTVS and, during Universo TOTVS held that year, the company unveiled version 12 of its Protheus Line, guided by its perennial proposition of releasing newer versions more frequently than before, which bring innovative features and improved performance and efficiency.

In 2017, TOTVS moves its head office for the second time. The new building, also on Avenida Braz Leme, spans 65,000 m² and can receive up to 3,000 people. It also brought together TOTVS employees working at diverse units across São Paulo.

In 2018, Laércio Cosentino rolls out the succession process, handing over the role of CEO to Dennis Herszkowicz and becomes the chairman of the company’s board of directors.

In 2019, TOTVS’ innovation lab in the US moves to Raleigh, North Carolina. That year, TOTVS also announced its joint venture with Vtex, which will enable the digital commerce platform to be contracted through TOTVS’ commercial structure.

The company also launched a communication campaign to show that TOTVS supports the sustainable growth of thousands businesses and entrepreneurs from the country's north to south by offering its technology. Also during the period, TOTVS announced the creation of TOTVS Techfin, its financial services unit that offers its clients credit products and B2B payments.

In 2020, the company’s efforts were focused on developing solutions to support clients in facing the pandemic. The same year, it created the Diversity and Inclusion Program, an important step in its people management strategy.

The year 2021 was marked by several milestones for the company, such as the publication of its ESG policy, as well as honors, such as the Exame Award – Best of ESG in Technology, and Best Technology Company at the InfoMoney Melhores na Bolsa Awards.

The company also launched a communication campaign, consisting of several videos focused on the brand, exclusively for digital channels, the first being ‘Mistério desvendado! É tudo!’ and a video narrating its history, ‘Bando de inconformados.’

Also in 2021, TOTVS announced the creation of Dimensa, its joint venture with B3.

Other important announcements during the year include:

 The creation of CVC Fund for investments in startups;
 A follow-on offering that raised R$1.44 billion from the issue of 39.27 million new common shares;
 The celebration of 15 years of its IPO on B3.

In 2022, TOTVS announced a joint venture with Itaú Unibanco, consolidating TOTVS Techfin’s focus on the distribution of financial services integrated into TOTVS management systems based on data intelligence, targeted at corporate clients and their entire chain of suppliers, clients and employees. The new company’s mission is to expand, simplify and democratize access to personalized financial services fully that are integrated to management systems (ERP).

Acquisitions 
TOTVS has so far carried out more than 40 acquisitions, a powerful lever of its strategy of strengthening its core business and expanding to new markets. The company is constantly expanding its businesses and always alert to new M&A opportunities in order to strengthen its portfolio.

Following is a timeline of key acquisitions:

Between 2004 and 2005, TOTVS acquired 100% of the capital stock of Sipros. Currently, in addition to the branch office, TOTVS has a Research & Development Center in Mexico, in the city of Querétaro. In 2005, the company also acquired Logocenter and, in 2006, announced the acquisition of RM Sistemas for approximately R$165 million.

In 2008, the company formalized the merger of TOTVS and Datasul, a company in Joinville, Santa Catarina, with 30 years of experience in the market and which, at the time, was TOTVS’ main domestic competitor in the software supply segment. Between 2009 and 2011, TOTVS acquired Total Banco, a supplier of solutions for the core business of banks.

In 2011, the company opened TOTVS Labs, a research center for cloud computing solutions, inside the campus of the University of California in San Diego, California. The next year, it opened an office in Silicon Valley, California.

In 2013, TOTVS acquired seven Brazilian software companies: PRX, ZeroPaper, RMS, 72% of Ciashop, Seventeen Tecnologia da Informação, W&D Participações, the parent company of PC Sistemas and PC Informática, and the U.S.-based GoodData.

In May 2014, it acquired Virtual Age, a company in Paraná that develops cloud-based software for textile fashion and apparel companies, for R$75.1 million, 

On August 14, 2015, TOTVS announced the acquisition of 100% of Bematech, a commercial automation company, for R$550 million. In May 2019, the company sold Bematech's hardware arm for R$25 million to Elgin. Also in 2019, the company acquired Supplier to reinforce Techfin’s credit portfolio.

On April 8, 2020, it acquired Wealth Systems, a company in the interior region of Paraná that develops CRM and cloud-based salesforce software, for R$27 million. Also in 2020, it acquired Consinco for R$252 million.

On December 21, 2020, the company announced the acquisition of Tail Target for R$12 million. On March 9, 2021, TOTVS announced the acquisition of RD Station, a marketing automation company, for R$1.86 billion. It acquired around 92% of the capital stock of the company located in Santa Catarina.

The year 2022, was marked by the acquisition of Feedz for R$66 million, as a way to expand its operations in human experience management.

The 3 Business Dimensions of TOTVS 
Recently, TOTVS started to focus on 3 business dimensions - Management, Techfin and Business Performance – to expand its operations along new growth avenues. Accordingly, its portfolio too gained this new look.

In the Management dimension are systems such as ERP, HR platforms and vertical solutions for companies in diverse economic sectors (focus on core business). The Techfin dimension comprises financial services offered through technology, such as B2B credit, prepayment of receivables, payments via Pix, credit cards or digital wallets. The Business Performance dimension includes solutions that enable clients to sell more and leverage their results. It comprises marketing automation, data intelligence, CRM and other platforms.

International Market 
Backed by its solid health and comprehensive portfolio, TOTVS expanded its business over the years and became a strategic partner for companies in Brazil and abroad. Currently, it is one of Latin America’s three leading technology players, with a market share of over 27%.

With cutting-edge technology that is localized for the tax and fiscal regulations and practices of each region, TOTVS supports clients in their international expansion through its own units and franchises in around 40 countries.

In Argentina, two units are located in Buenos Aires, one of them responsible for the commercial operations of Latin America’s South Hub, and the other dedicated specifically to the hospitality sector. In Mexico, TOTVS has a technology development center in Querétaro and a commercial operation unit of the Latin America North Hub in Mexico City.

The unit in Colombia is located in Bogotá, which is responsible for the commercial operations of the Latin America Andean Hub. The Company’s unit in Chile is located in Santiago, which markets products for the hospitality sector.

In the United States, TOTVS’ innovation laboratory TOTVS Labs is located in Raleigh, North Carolina.

People (Human Capital) 
TOTVS promotes a humane, inclusive, collaborative and innovative work environment. Although the company’s policy has structured guidelines and processes, employees are encouraged to exercise autonomy.

TOTVS’ internal culture, #WEARETOTVERS, is based on the following pillars: Technology + Knowledge are Our DNA; The Success of Our Clients is Our Success; and We Value Good Professionals Who Are Good People. It’s these elements that translate the characteristics of people making up our human capital and guide their actions.

To guide its daily management routine, TOTVS has the Human Resources and Compensation Policy, which establishes the guidelines and responsibilities in the people management process across TOTVS, in all stages of the People Management Cycle – Attraction, Development and Engagement –, all in alignment with the internal culture and observing the concept meritocracy in their actions.

Attraction and development actions respect and value diversity and inclusion among employees. TOTVS neither practices nor tolerates discriminatory actions based on race, culture, age, religion, gender, sexual orientation or any other aspect.

Promoting human rights, diversity and inclusion are part of TOTVS’ culture and values. The importance of diversity and inclusion (D&I) led the Company to design a program divided into four main pillars: gender, LGBTI+, people with disabilities, race & ethnicity. The program was officially launched in March 2020 after an extensive survey among the internal public.

Diversity and inclusion is also one of TOTVS’ strategic drivers, whose purpose is to retain and attract the best talent. TOTVS believes that a more diverse and inclusive workforce is important not only for innovation but also to understand the needs of an increasingly diversified client base.

The company is a signatory to the UN Women’s Empowerment Principles (WEPS) and launched an important initiative related to this topic: #ELASNATOTVS, a talent bank specifically for women interested in working at TOTVS. The program, valid for everyone who identifies themselves with the female gender, is designed to promote gender equality in the technology market.

In 2021, the company also created affinity groups, which are safe spaces where TOTVERS can exchange experiences, discuss a wide range of topics, their specific features and celebrate who they are. The groups also allow everyone to reflect on initiatives that should be implemented at TOTVS to stimulate engagement among other TOTVERS and create a more inclusive environment. Affinity groups were divided into four minority groups: gender, LGBTQIAPI+, people with disabilities and ethnic-racial. Employees who are not part of any group can support this movement as an ally.

ESG 
TOTVS is committed to the development of an ESG agenda that reflects its purpose about how its business can positively influence and impact society, both as an employer and as a social agent. The company believes in the transforming power of technology and in its capacity to build a more digital, productive, sustainable and inclusive ecosystem. It also believes that strengthening ESG pillars can create numerous opportunities for stakeholders to create value.

Based on the materiality matrix, the ESG agenda is updated periodically, considering the most relevant topics for stakeholders and those with greater potential to create a positive impact.

In late 2020, TOTVS disclosed its Sustainability Policy, which defines the guidelines for its actions related to sustainable development. Since 2014, the company has been a signatory to the UN Global Compact and informs annually, through the Integrated Report, its results and advances on the topics making up the commitments. TOTVS also participates in the Global Compact work groups, including the affirmation of the Ten Universal Principles derived from the Universal Declaration of Human Rights, the ILO Declaration on Fundamental Principles and Rights at Work, the Rio Declaration on Environment and Development and the UN Convention Against Corruption.

TOTVS was the first Brazilian technology company to sign the UN Global Compact’s Call to Action, which recognizes corruption as one of the biggest obstacles to economic and social development around the world.

The company is also aligned with the UN Sustainable Development Goals (SDG), a global agenda of 17 goals and 169 targets to be achieved by 2030, adopted during the UN Summit on Sustainable Development held in September 2015.

TOTVS is also in the process of joining the Carbon Disclosure Project (CDP), whose focus is on environmental impacts and climate change issues. In 2014, we signed the Business Pact for Integrity and Against Corruption launched by the Ethos Institute, whose goal is to mobilize, raise awareness and help companies manage their businesses in a sustainable and socially responsible manner, as well as promote a more honest and ethical market while eradicating bribery and corruption.

The Pact’s functions include support to implementing policies that promote integrity and combat corruption and mobilizing companies and business entities. Among other external initiatives, TOTVS is a member of the Integrity Working Group of the Ethos Institute, a forum for exchanging experiences among companies to discuss integrity issues in business practices and the implementation of policies to promote integrity and combat corruption, related to the Business Pact.

The year 2021 was marked by more intensive efforts in ESG governance and greater engagement on ESG themes through new action fronts and greater focus on the ESG Working Group. TOTVS was recognized by the market, as evident from its improved ISS ESG Corporate Rating, inclusion in the “Best in ESG” ranking of Exame magazine, and inclusion in the ESG portfolios of JP Morgan and BTG Pactual.

References

External links 
  in English
  in English
  in Portuguese

Companies listed on B3 (stock exchange)
Technology companies of Brazil
Companies based in São Paulo
Software companies of Brazil
ERP software companies
Brazilian brands